The Lega Basket A (officially: Lega Società di Pallacanestro Serie A, English: Basket League) is the organizing body, as delegated by the Italian Basketball Federation, of the top division of Italian professional men's basketball league, the Serie A (English: Basket League A Series). It is composed of the clubs that participate in the Lega Basket Serie A. It is headquartered in Bologna, Italy.

Basket League is a founding member of ULEB. Basket League organizes the LBA, the Italian Cup, the Italian Supercup, and the Italian All Star Game. Discussions have been held as to the possibility of Basket League gaining more autonomy, similarly to that of the corresponding football organization, Lega Serie A. It is the sole professional sport league in Italy outside football. The current president of Basket League is Fernando Marino.

History
Basket League was officially incorporated on May 27, 1970, in Milan, and included the clubs that participated in both the first division Serie A and the second division Serie A2. On June 20, 2001, it changed to include just the first division Serie A clubs.

Presidents
Presidents of Basket League from 1970 to present.

1970–72: Adalberto Tedeschi
1972–77: Giancarlo Tesini
1977–79: Gianni Corsolini
1979–84: Luciano Acciari
1984–92: Gianni De Michelis
1992–94: Giulio Malgara
1994–96: Roberto Allievi
1996–98: Angelo Rovati
1998–00: Alfredo Cazzola
2000–01: Sergio D'Antoni
2001–02: Marco Madrigali
2002–07: Enrico Prandi
2007: Umberto Pieraccioni
2007–08: Francesco Corrado
2009–14: Valentino Renzi
2014: Fernando Marino
2016–2020: Egidio Bianchi
2020–present: Umberto Gandini

See also
Serie A (Basketball)
Serie A2 (Basketball)
Italian Basketball Federation
Italian Basketball Cup
Italian Basketball Supercup
Italian All Star Game

References

External links
 
Italian Basketball Federation Official Site 

Basketball governing bodies in Europe
Basketball in Italy
Lega Basket Serie A
Bas
Professional sports leagues in Italy